Route départementale 612, or RD 612, is located:

in the departments of Hérault and Tarn, it connects Montpellier to Albi, taking over the old RN 112, which was downgraded in 2006.
in the department of Pyrénées-Orientales, it connects Estagel to Elne, taking over the old RN 612, decommissioned in 1972.
in the department of the Tarn, the RD 612 connects Albi to Castres in 42 kilometers.

Accidents between Albi and Castres
This section has around 11,000 vehicles per day, including 1,000 trucks.

Between 2012 and 2017, the RD 612 counted between Albi and Castres 25 accidents, 9 killed, 44 injured, 25 of which were serious. Due to the numerous speed-related accidents, this section of road has four fixed speed cameras.

The president of the Tarn departmental council plans to increase the speed to 90 km/h on the section of the départmental 612 located between Albi and Castres.

References

612
Transport in Occitania (administrative region)